Orthocomotis parattonsa is a species of moth of the family Tortricidae. It is found in Morona-Santiago Province, Ecuador.

Appearance 
The wingspan is generally around 20 mm. The color of the forewings is cream, suffused with pale brownish orange and brownish. The hindwings are dark brown.

Etymology 
The species is named for the Shuar people who live in the region around Macas.

References

Moths described in 2003
Orthocomotis